Sari Kuchakeh (also Romanized as Sārī Kūchakeh; also known as Sārī and Sārān) is a village in Kuhdasht-e Jonubi Rural District, in the Central District of Kuhdasht County, Lorestan Province, Iran. At the 2006 census, its population was 148, in 31 families.

References 

Towns and villages in Kuhdasht County